Pound is the name of various units of currency. It is used in some countries today and previously was used in many others. The currency's symbol is £, a stylised form of the blackletter 'L' (from ), crossed to indicate abbreviation.

The term was adopted in England from the weight of silver used to make to 240 pennies, and eventually spread to British colonies all over the world. While silver pennies were produced seven centuries earlier, the first pound coin was minted under Henry VII in 1489.

Countries and territories currently using currency units named "pound"

Historical currencies
 Australian pound (until 1966, replaced by the Australian dollar). The Australian pound was also used in the Gilbert and Ellice Islands, Nauru, New Hebrides and Papua and New Guinea. It was replaced in the New Hebrides/Vanuatu in 1981 by the Vanuatu vatu.
 Bahamian pound (until 1966, replaced by the Bahamian dollar)

 Bermudian pound (until 1970, replaced by the Bermudian dollar)
 Biafran pound (1968 to 1970, replaced by the Nigerian pound)
 British West African pound
 in British Cameroon replaced by the CFA franc in 1961
 in Gambia, replaced by the Gambian pound in 1968
 in Ghana, replaced by the Ghanaian pound in 1958
 in Liberia, replaced by the U.S. dollar in 1943
 in Nigeria, replaced by the Nigerian pound in 1958
 in Sierra Leone, replaced by the leone in 1964
 Canadian pound (until 1859, replaced by the Canadian dollar)
 Cypriot pound (Cyprus and Sovereign Base Areas of Akrotiri and Dhekelia, until 1 January 2008, replaced by the euro)
 Fijian pound (until 1969, replaced by the Fijian dollar)
 Gambian pound (1968 to 1971, replaced by the dalasi)
 Ghanaian pound (1958 to 1965, replaced by the cedi)
 Irish pound (Irish: Punt na hÉireann) (until 2002, replaced by the euro)
 Israeli pound, also known as the Israeli lira (until 1980, replaced by the sheqel)
 Jamaican pound (until 1968, replaced by the Jamaican dollar). The Jamaican pound was also used in Cayman Islands and Turks and Caicos Islands until 1968.
 Jordanian pound; see Palestine pound, below.
 Libyan pound (until 1971, replaced by the Libyan dinar)
 Malawian pound (1964 to 1970, replaced by the Malawian kwacha)
 Maltese pound (also known as the Maltese lira and replaced by the euro on 1 January 2008)
 New Brunswick pound (until 1860, replaced by the New Brunswick dollar)
 Newfoundland pound (until 1865, replaced by the Newfoundland dollar)
 New Guinean pound
 New Zealand pound (until 1967, replaced by the New Zealand dollar). The New Zealand pound was also used in the Cook Islands and the Pitcairn Islands.
 Nigerian pound (1958 to 1973, replaced by the naira)
 Nova Scotian pound (until 1860, replaced by the Nova Scotian dollar)
 Oceanian pound (1942-1945 under Japanese occupation of Kiribati, Nauru, New Guinea, Solomon Islands and Tuvalu)
 Palestine pound (replaced by the Israeli pound; also served as Jordanian pound, replaced in Jordan by the Jordanian dinar)
 Pound Scots of Scotland (until 1707 union with England)
 Prince Edward Island pound (until 1871, replaced by the Prince Edward Island dollar)
 Rhodesian pound (1964 until 1970 in Rhodesia, replaced by the Rhodesian dollar)
 Rhodesia and Nyasaland pound (1955-1964, replaced in Southern Rhodesia renamed Rhodesia by the Rhodesian pound, in Northern Rhodesia renamed Zambia by the Zambian pound, and in Nyasaland renamed Malawi by the Malawian pound)
 Samoan pound (1914–1920 provisional issue by the New Zealand Government military administration. 1920–1959 by the New Zealand Government administration (Treasury notes). 1960–1963 by the Bank of Western Samoa. Replaced 1967 by the tala ($).)
 Scottish pound: see Pound Scots, above.
 Solomon Islands pound (1916-1932, replaced by the Australian pound)
 South African pound (until 1961, replaced by South African rand). The South African pound was also used in Basutoland, Bechuanaland, South West Africa and Swaziland.
 South African Republic pond (refers to the republic in Transvaal, issued 1867–1902, replaced by the South African pound)
 South West African pound (1930s to 1961, replaced by South African rand)
 Southern Rhodesian pound (1896-1955, circulated also in Northern Rhodesia and Nyasaland; replaced by Rhodesia and Nyasaland pound)
 Sudanese pound (until 1992 and since January 2007)
 Tongan pound (1921–1966 Government of Tonga Treasury notes. 1967 replaced by the pa'anga ($))
 Transvaal pound (see above, South African Republic pond)
 West Indian pound (until 1949, replaced by East Caribbean dollar)
 Western Samoan pound (1920-1967, replaced by Samoan tala)
 Zambian pound (1964 to 1968, replaced by the Zambian kwacha)

Currencies of the former British colonies in America
All of the following currencies have been replaced by the US dollar.
 Connecticut pound (Connecticut)
 Delaware pound (Delaware)
 Georgia pound (Georgia)
 Maryland pound (Maryland)
 Massachusetts pound (Massachusetts)
 New Hampshire pound (New Hampshire)
 New Jersey pound (New Jersey)
 New York pound (New York)
 North Carolina pound (North Carolina)
 Pennsylvania pound (Pennsylvania)
 Rhode Island pound (Rhode Island)
 South Carolina pound (South Carolina)
 Virginia pound (Virginia)

See also

 Green pound, used within the European Union's Common Agricultural Policy until 1999
 Libra (weight), an ancient Roman unit of weight, basis for the Carolingian pound
 Local exchange trading system: many British LETS use(d) the term "pound"
 Bristol pound, a LETS unit

Notes

References

 
Denominations (currency)